The Aloe Museum is a museum in Aruba.

A tour of the museum and factory provides insight into the Aruba aloe production process, along with the 160-year history of aloe cultivation in Aruba.

The factory holds complimentary tour guides in languages ranging from English, Dutch, Spanish and Papiamento (Aruba's native language) every 15 minutes. The museum is open from 8:00 am to 4:30 pm on Mondays to Fridays. On Saturdays, the museum is open from 9:00 am to 4:00 pm. The museum is closed on Sundays. There is a walking tour that includes the aloe cutting room, the testing lab, the filling room, and even packing and storage.

See also 
 List of museums in Aruba

References

External links 
 

Museums in Aruba